LATAM Colombia serves the following destinations:

References

LATAM Colombia
LAN Airlines